Sir John Harman ( – 11 October 1673) was an English naval officer who was captain and then admiral during the three Anglo-Dutch wars between 1652 and 1673.
He fought in several major battles.
He was captain of the flagship of the Duke of York, the future King James II of England, in the Battle of Lowestoft in 1665.
The Dutch were defeated but escaped when Harman reduced sail due to a mistaken order.
There was a great scandal over this incident, but Harman was completely absolved and was promoted to rear admiral.
He played an epic role in the St. James's Day Battle in 1666.
In 1667 he destroyed a French fleet off Martinique, then captured the French and Dutch colonies in South America.
He died while still active as an admiral during the Third Anglo-Dutch War.

Early career

Little is known about Harman's origins and early years.
His family may have originated in Suffolk, and may have been shipowners who leased their ships to the state.
He was a "tarpaulin", a captain who had worked his way up through the ranks, as opposed to a gentleman who had purchased or been granted his officer status.

First Anglo-Dutch War (1652–53)

The First Anglo-Dutch War began in July 1652.
The first clear record of John Harman is as commander of the 40-gun Welcome with a crew of 180.
Harman commanded the Welcome on 28 September 1652 at the Battle of the Kentish Knock, when the Dutch were prevented from sailing up the River Thames to attack London.
He commanded the Welcome in the Battle of Portland on 18 February 1652/53.
He was still commander of the Welcome in the Battle of the Gabbard on 2–3 June 1653, where his ship was disabled.
Fighting with the Dutch ended after the Battle of Scheveningen in July 1653.
The war was formally ended by the Treaty of Westminster of 3 April 1654.

Inter-war period (1653–65)

Harman was given command of the Diamond in August 1653, and in 1654 sailed to the Mediterranean in the Diamond under Admiral Robert Blake.  
He returned to England in October 1655.
On 4 January 1655/56 he was given command of the Worcester and again sailed with Blake.
In the Battle of Cadiz (9 September 1656) he commanded the 52-gun Tredagh in Captain Richard Stayner's squadron and captured a merchantman intact with its valuable cargo.
He seems to have participated in the brilliant victory in the Battle of Santa Cruz de Tenerife (1657).
Harman was appointed captain of the 58-gun Gloucester in 1664.
In the spring of 1665 Harman was lieutenant of the Royal Charles, in effect captain of the ship.

Second Anglo-Dutch War (1665–67)
The Second Anglo-Dutch War was declared in May 1665.
During this war the English suffered from the Great Plague of 1665-66 and the Great Fire of London in September 1666.
The war was concluded by the Treaty of Breda on 21 July 1667.

Battle of Lowestoft

The Battle of Lowestoft was the first large naval action in the Second Anglo-Dutch War.
In this battle on 3 June 1665 (old style) the Royal Charles was the flagship of James, Duke of York, the future King James II of England.
Sir William Penn, who was also on the Royal Charles, was captain of the fleet.
The Royal Charles was engaged with the Dutch flagship, the Eendracht when the latter was blown up.
The Dutch fled in confusion. 
Sir William Penn, who was sick and exhausted, and the Duke of York both retired to their cabins.
The Royal Charles was leading the pursuit under Harman's command when Henry Brouncker, the duke's gentleman-in-waiting, asked Harman to shorten sail.
Brounker gave as his reason the danger to the duke if the Royal Charles, which was the closest of the English ships to the Dutch, were to find itself alone in an engagement with the Dutch on the coast of Holland.
Harman said he could do nothing without orders.
Brounker went back to the cabin, then returned to Harman and said the duke ordered him to shorten sail, which Harman did.
The other pursuing ships slowed in response and the Dutch escaped.
The incident caused a scandal and a parliamentary inquiry was held in which Harman was absolved of all blame, which was laid on Brouncker.

On 13 June 1665 Harman was knighted and promoted to rear admiral of the White squadron with the Resolution (formerly Tredagh) as his flagship.
On 25 October 1665 Harman took command of the recently refitted frigate Revenge, with 58 guns and a crew of 300.
In November he was sent with 18 ships to escort the merchant fleet home from Gothenburg.
After his return he moved his flag to the 80-gun Henry.
He fought in the Four Days' Battle (1–4 June 1666).

St. James's Day Battle

With the Henry as his flagship Harman played a conspicuous part in the St. James's Day Battle on 4–5 August 1666 off the North Foreland of the coast of Kent.
The English fleet was commanded in this long battle against the Dutch by George Monck, 1st Duke of Albemarle.
The fighting was savage.
The admiral Sir George Ayscue was captured and the vice-admiral Sir William Berkeley was killed.
The White squadron suffered the greatest damage.
Harman led the van of the English fleet and was soon in the center of the Zeeland squadron, where his ship became completely disabled.

An enemy fire ship grappled the Henry on the starboard side, but through extraordinary exertion his boatswain managed to detach the grappling irons.
A second fire ship grappled the Henry on the larboard side, and the sails caught fire.
Almost fifty of the crew jumped overboard.
Sir John drew his sword and threatened to kill any other men who tried to leave the ship or who failed to fight the fire.
The remaining crew managed to quench the fire, but the burnt rigging let one of the top-sail yards fall and it broke Harman's leg.
A third fire ship now approached but was sunk by fire from the Henry'''s lower-deck guns.
The Dutch vice-admiral Evertzen approached and offered to accept a surrender.
Harman refused and fired a broadside that killed Evertzen.
The Dutch now held back from the Henry, which despite the damage it had suffered was able to sail back to Harwich.
Harman managed to make enough repairs to put to sea again the next day, hoping to resume the fight despite his broken leg.
He found that the engagement had been broken off.

West Indies (1667)

Harman had to resign his command while he recovered from his injury.
Early in 1667 he was sent as admiral and commander in chief of a fleet that was sent to the West Indies.
By special order his ship flew the Union Jack.
He reached Barbados in early June and on 10 June 1667 sailed for Saint Kitts, which the French had just captured.
He failed to recapture the island, and was holding a council of war when news arrived that 23–24 French warships and 3 fire ships were lying at Martinique.
Harman directed his fleet to Martinique, where he found the French ships lying close to the shore under the protection of the batteries.

The French commander Antoine Lefèbvre de La Barre and the governor of Martinique Robert de Clodoré had returned there after an attempt to take Nevis had failed when La Barre left the scene.
La Barre and Clodoré were arguing when Harman's fleet arrived and in the Battle of Martinique bombarded the French ships off Saint-Pierre.
Harman was suffering badly from gout and had difficulty moving, but despite this gave orders throughout the engagement.
He attacked several times, and on 25 June 1667 set fire to the French admiral's ship and six or seven other strong vessels.
La Barre appears to have panicked and ordered his ships to be scuttled.
Several others were sunk, some sank themselves and only two or three escaped.
The English lost no more than 80 men killed, although others were wounded and the ships suffered considerable damage and loss of ammunition.

South America

Harman then sailed to South America, and on 15 September 1667 captured Cayenne.
His fleet destroyed Fort Cépérou and the French colonial settlement of Cayenne.
The French governor Cyprien Lefebvre de Lézy fled the colony on 23 September 1667.
Harman arrived at the mouth of the Suriname River on 3 October 1667.
The next morning he entered the river on the Bonaventure accompanied by the Assurance and Norwich, the Portsmouth and Roe ketches under lieutenant-general Henry Willoughby and a sloop.
Willoughby sent a messenger demanding that the Dutch surrender.
On 8 October 1667 Harman captured Fort Zeelandia.
Harman returned to Barbados on 10 November 1667, and since peace had been concluded he sailed for England, arriving in the Downs on 7 April 1668.

Inter-war period (1668–72)

Harman served under Sir Thomas Allin in 1669–70 in the expedition to the Straits.
In this expedition Allin was sent to punish the Barbary corsairs for violating the treaty between England and Algiers and plundering English merchantmen.
He captured and destroyed a great many of their vessels before returning to England.
In 1672 Harman was appointed rear-admiral of the Blue squadron under the immediate command of Edward Montagu, 1st Earl of Sandwich.

Third Anglo-Dutch War (1672–74)

The first major engagement of the Third Anglo-Dutch War, in which the English were allies of the French, was the Battle of Solebay on 28 May 1672.
Harman was a flag officer in Sandwich's squadron in this battle.
The squadron took the brunt of the Dutch attack.
The 40-gun frigate Dover, commanded by John Ernle, saved Harman and the Charles from a fire ship.

Harman was a flag officer in Prince Rupert's squadron in the Battle of Texel in 1673.
In 1673 Harman was vice-admiral of the red squadron with the London as his flagship.
He played a distinguished role in the second engagement with Michiel de Ruyter, despite being weak and sick.
He was appointed admiral of the blue squadron when Sir Edward Spragge died, but he died himself on 11 October 1673 before taking up command.
England and Holland concluded the war with the Treaty of Westminster of 19 February 1674.

Harman married and had one son and one daughter. 
His son, James Harman, was a captain in the navy and died on 19 January 1677 in a fight with an Algerian cruiser.
The National Maritime Museum, Greenwich, London, has a three-quarter-length portrait of Harman by Peter Lely, part of the Flagmen of Lowestoft'' series of 13 portraits of senior ship's officers in the Battle of Lowestoft commissioned by James, Duke of York.
Harman is turned away, looking back at the viewer over his left shoulder.

Notes

Citations

Sources

 

1673 deaths
Royal Navy admirals
Royal Navy personnel of the First Anglo-Dutch War
Royal Navy personnel of the Second Anglo-Dutch War
Royal Navy personnel of the Third Anglo-Dutch War